Antoaneta Kostadinova, née Boneva (born 17 January 1986) is a Bulgarian sport shooter. At the 2012 Summer Olympics, she competed in the Women's 10 metre air pistol and the women's 25 metre pistol. At the 2020 Summer Olympics, she won a silver medal in the Women's 10 metre air pistol. In December 2021, Kostadinova came third in the Bulgarian Sportsperson of the Year ranking, earning 995 points.

References

External links
 
 

1986 births
Living people
Bulgarian female sport shooters
Olympic shooters of Bulgaria
Shooters at the 2012 Summer Olympics
Shooters at the 2016 Summer Olympics
People from Targovishte
Shooters at the 2015 European Games
European Games silver medalists for Bulgaria
European Games medalists in shooting
Shooters at the 2019 European Games
European Games bronze medalists for Bulgaria
Olympic silver medalists for Bulgaria
Medalists at the 2020 Summer Olympics
Olympic medalists in shooting
Shooters at the 2020 Summer Olympics
20th-century Bulgarian women
21st-century Bulgarian women